Juni Rocket Racer Rebel Cortez is a fictional character and the male protagonist of the Spy Kids franchise, portrayed by Daryl Sabara in the film series and voiced by Carter Hastings in the television series.

Appearances

Spy Kids
Juni, like his older sister Carmen, had no idea his parents were secret agents until the first Spy Kids film. He is very insecure with himself, and lives in the world of the television show, Floop's Fooglies. When Juni learns that Floop is really a criminal mastermind that had kidnapped his parents, he takes it surprisingly well, adjusting to the fact very quickly. Juni wins some respect from his sister on their quest. It was shown within the first two movies that Juni is able to mimic another person's voice perfectly, a trait that his father claims he gets from his mother.

Spy Kids 2: The Island of Lost Dreams
In Spy Kids 2: The Island of Lost Dreams, Juni develops a crush on the president's daughter Alexandra. There is particularly friction between Juni and Gary Giggles due to Carmen's romantic interest in Gary. After a fight resulting in Magna Men stealing a prototype of the Transmooker (it being caused when Gary tried to take it from Juni for the glory, only to blame Juni when the Magna Men took it away), Juni gets fired from the OSS. However, Carmen hacked him back in the organization so they could recover the Transmooker. After they successfully save the Transmooker from Donagon Giggles, Gary's father, Juni quit the OSS. Juni's robotic pet spider, R.A.L.P.H., is first shown in this film near in the beginning sections, but is later squashed by Gary Giggles, after he is sent to spy over him and his sister during the briefing of the Ukata Assignment, but shown fixed during the credits.

Spy Kids 3-D: Game Over
In Spy Kids 3-D: Game Over Juni is pulled out of retirement to rescue his sister from her failed mission to shut down the video game Game Over. Juni finds her, but it is no accident. Juni and the others are secretly being manipulated, because the Toymaker has an interest in Juni's grandfather. Despite this, or rather because of this, Juni and the others manage to save the day.

Spy Kids: All the Time in the World
In Spy Kids: All the Time in the World, Juni is now a supporting character, with less screentime as to focus on the newer agents. During the long gap between the 3rd and 4th film, Carmen and Juni have not gotten along very well, mostly picking on each other like they did in the 1st film. After trying to work on his own as a spy, he reveals to Carmen he didn't think it would be cool to work with his sister. However, in the end they reconcile and become co-leaders of the new Spy Kids program.

Spy Kids: Mission Critical
Carter Hastings replaced Sabara in the role of Juni in the animated series Spy Kids: Mission Critical in a main capacity. The series follows Juni and Carmen as they train and lead a team of fellow Spy Kids cadets against the forces of S.W.A.M.P. (Sinister Wrongdoers Against Mankind's Preservation) and their diabolical leader, Golden Brain.

References

Fictional private investigators
Fictional Hispanic and Latino American people
Fictional secret agents and spies
Spy Kids characters
Child characters in film
Film characters introduced in 2001